Deborah Brace Winters (born November 27, 1953) is an American film and television actress and realtor who has appeared in films such as Kotch, The People Next Door, Class of '44 and the television miniseries The Winds of War.

Early life
Deborah Winters was born in Los Angeles, California, the daughter of Ralph Winters, head of television casting for Universal Studios for 28 years, and actress Penny Edwards. She began her film and television career at age five after moving to New York, where she attended the Professional Children's School. She later commenced professional training at the Stella Adler Studio of Acting, New York City. She returned to Los Angeles in 1968, where she studied acting under Lee Strasberg at the Lee Strasberg Institute. Winters continued working, appearing in commercials for Kinney Shoes, Gulf Oil, Lincoln-Mercury, Quaker Oats, and others. In 1966, she received her first major screen role in the Fred Coe comedy-drama, Me, Natalie.

Film and television career
Winters was first cast in the 1968 motion picture Me, Natalie, opposite Patty Duke, James Farentino, and Martin Balsam. She followed shortly afterwards with a second co-starring role opposite Michael Douglas in his first film, the 1969 Hail, Hero!, directed by David Miller. This was followed by a starring role in the CBS Playhouse production of The People Next Door which led to the motion picture remake the following year.

The People Next Door received positive reviews. Roger Ebert said in his Chicago Sun-Times review, "Deborah Winters, is disturbing at first because you think she's too mannered. Gradually the mannerisms become indispensable to the characterization."

Jack Lemmon cast Winters as the female lead opposite Walter Matthau in his sole directorial project, Kotch in 1971. Time wrote of Winters in its October 11, 1972, review, "Winters is one of the few young actresses with comic timing." Winters continued acting with starring roles in film and episodic television including Blue Sunshine (1978), The Outing (1987), and Lottery!.

Personal life
Winters is married to Warren Chaney. , she worked as a real estate agent.

Selected filmography

Film
Me, Natalie (1969) – Betty
Hail, Hero! (1969) – Becky
The People Next Door (1970) – Maxie Mason
Kotch (1971) – Erica Herzenstiel
Cilali Ibo Teksas fatihi (1972)
Class of '44 (1973) – Julie
Six Characters in Search of an Author (1976) – The Ingenue
Blue Sunshine (1978) – Alicia Sweeney
The Outing (1987) – Eve Ferrell / Young Arab Woman / Old Arab Woman
Behind the Mask (1992) – Annie Strayton

Television
Tarantulas: The Deadly Cargo (1977) – Cindy Beck
Crisis in Sun Valley (1978) – Sandy
The Winds of War (1983) – Janice Lacouture Henry
Little Girl Lost (1988) – File Clerk

References

External links
 
 

1953 births
Living people
American film actresses
Actresses from Los Angeles
Actresses from Houston
American television actresses
American stage actresses
American voice actresses
20th-century American actresses
21st-century American actresses
American real estate brokers